Cosmelia is a monotypic  genus of flowering plants in the family Ericaceae. The sole species is Cosmelia rubra, commonly known as spindle heath, found in swampy sites in the south-west of Western Australia.

The genus was formally described in 1810 by botanist Robert Brown.

References

Epacridoideae
Monotypic Ericaceae genera
Plants described in 1810
Taxa named by Robert Brown (botanist, born 1773)